The 1896–97 Scottish Districts season is a record of all the rugby union matches for Scotland's district teams.

History

Glasgow District beat Edinburgh District in the Inter-City match.

Results

Inter-City

Glasgow District:

Edinburgh District:

Other Scottish matches

Edinburgh District:

South of Scotland District: 

North of Scotland:

Midlands:

English matches

No other District matches played.

International matches

No touring matches this season.

References

1896–97 in Scottish rugby union
Scottish Districts seasons